The John E. Lee House is a historic two-story house in Hyde Park, Utah. It was built in 1903 by Jesse Hancey for John E. Lee, and designed in the Victorian Eclectic style by Lee's father, Christian C. Lee. Lee, who was a farmer and stockraiser, lived here with his wife, Hattie Reeder Lee, until his death in 1957. The Lees were members of the Church of Jesus Christ of Latter-day Saints. The house has been listed on the National Register of Historic Places since February 11, 1982.

References

		
National Register of Historic Places in Cache County, Utah
Victorian architecture in Utah
Houses completed in 1903
1903 establishments in Utah